Sheikh Wasil Railway Station (Balochi: شیخ واصل ریلوے اسٹیشن ) is located in Pakistan.

See also
 List of railway stations in Pakistan
 Pakistan Railways

References

External links

Railway stations in Balochistan, Pakistan
Railway stations on Quetta–Taftan Railway Line